For other places named Coldwater in Texas, see Coldwater, Texas.

Coldwater, Texas is a small town in Dallam County, Texas. There were 53 inhabitants in 2000.

References

Unincorporated communities in Dallam County, Texas
Unincorporated communities in Texas